Redenhall was a station in the small hamlet of Redenhall, Norfolk. It was opened in 1861 as part of the Waveney Valley Line between Tivetshall and Beccles and closed in 1866. It was close to the settlement of Harleston.

References

Disused railway stations in Norfolk
Former Great Eastern Railway stations
Railway stations in Great Britain opened in 1861
Railway stations in Great Britain closed in 1866
1861 establishments in England